Evert Dudok (born February 23, 1959 in Venlo, Netherlands) has been the President of EADS Astrium Satellites since June 2007. Prior to this date he was president of EADS Astrium Space Transportation since June 2005. Before that he was Head of Earth Observation & Science division at EADS Astrium since March 2002.

Evert Dudok started his career with DASA in Ottobrunn in 1984, where he worked many years for "Payload Antennas" activities. Since the beginning of Astrium, he was Head of the Business Unit “Navigation and constellations” in the Business Division “Telecommunication & Navigation”.

References

1959 births
Living people
Dutch businesspeople
Dutch engineers
People from Venlo